Stenbäck is a surname. Notable people with the surname include:
 
 Josef Stenbäck (1854—1929), Finnish church architect and engineer 
 Pär Stenbäck (born 1941), Finnish politician
 Helena Stenbäck (born 1979), Swedish beauty pageant contestant
 Johnny Stenbäck, Finnish software developer

See also
 Stenbeck